Ming Luke is an American conductor who is the Principal Guest Conductor of the San Francisco Ballet, Music Director and Principal Conductor of the Nashville Ballet, founder and Program Director of Festival Napa Valley's Blackburn Music Academy, Music Director of the Merced Symphony, Music Director of the Berkeley Community Chorus and Orchestra, and Education Director and Conductor of the Berkeley Symphony

Luke's performance of Britten's War Requiem was voted top choral performance in the San Francisco Bay area in 2016 by the San Francisco Classical Voice and San Francisco Chronicle stated that his performance of San Francisco Ballet's Romeo and Juliet in 2015 was the  "best live theater performance" of the work.  Highlights of his career include conducting the Bolshoi Orchestra in Moscow, performances of Cinderella and Romeo and Juliet at the Kennedy Center, conducting at the Théâtre du Châtelet in Paris, and conducting Dvorak’s Requiem in Dvorak Hall in Prague.  Ming Luke was named one of Diablo Magazine'''s 40 Under 40 in the East Bay Luke has been profiled and his work featured in Nashville Public Radio, The Tennessean San Francisco Classical Voice, and the Napa Valley Register''.

He has guested with various ballet companies including Boston Ballet, conducting the Nutcracker in December 2016 and again in May 2018 leading performances of Sleeping Beauty.

Luke attended Carnegie Mellon University, graduating with an MFA in conducting, and Westminster Choir College, graduated with a double major in music education and piano pedagogy.

References 

American male conductors (music)
San Francisco Ballet
Westminster Choir College alumni
Year of birth missing (living people)
Living people